Higgins Soccer Complex is a 1,000-seat soccer-specific stadium in Philadelphia, Pennsylvania. It is home to the Villanova Wildcats men's and women's soccer teams. The facility opened in 2014 and cost $3 million. The field FieldTurf surface.

The field is adjacent to Zimmerman Field, which is used for practices.

References 

Soccer venues in Pennsylvania
2014 establishments in Pennsylvania
Sports venues completed in 2014